Mung bean sheets are a type of Chinese noodle. It is transparent, flat, and sheet-like. They can be found, in dried form, in China and occasionally in some Chinatowns overseas.

Description
Similar to cellophane noodles, mung bean sheets are made of mung beans, except they are different in shape.  The sheets are approximately 1 cm wide, like fettuccine noodles. They are produced in the Shandong province of eastern China (where cellophane noodles are also produced), as well as in the northern city of Tianjin, and have a springier, chewier texture than the thinner noodles.

Use in dishes
Mung bean sheets are used for cold dishes, hot pots, and stir fried dishes, in conjunction with sliced meats and/or seafood, vegetables, and seasonings. One such dish is Liang Fen, where the noodles are served cold with chili oil.

Chinese noodles
Shandong cuisine